The 2015–16 Abilene Christian Wildcats women's basketball team represented Abilene Christian University in Texas, United States during the 2015–16 NCAA Division I women's basketball season. The Wildcats, led by third year head coach Julie Goodenough and played their home games at the Moody Coliseum. This was the third year of a 4-year transition phase from D2 to D1, In the third year of transition, Abilene Christian could not participate in the Southland Tournament, but was a Division I counter and was part of the Division I rpi calculation. The Wildcats played a full conference schedule in 2015–16. Although they weren't eligible for the Southland Conference and NCAA tournaments, the Wildcats did compete in the WNIT where they lost in the first round to UTEP. They finished the season 26–4, 17–1 to win the Southland Regular season title.

Roster

Schedule

|-
!colspan=9 style="background:#531C79; color:#FFFFFF;"| Out of Conference Schedule

|-
!colspan=9 style="background:#531C79; color:#FFFFFF;"| Southland Conference Schedule

|-
!colspan=9 style="background:#531C79; color:#FFFFFF;"| WNIT

See also
2015–16 Abilene Christian Wildcats men's basketball team

References

Abilene Christian Wildcats women's basketball seasons
Abilene Christian
2016 Women's National Invitation Tournament participants